Malbazar Railway Station also known as Old Malbazar Railway Station   is one of the railway station that serves the town of Malbazar, Jalpaiguri district in the Indian state of West Bengal, the other being New Mal Junction. The station lies on New Mal–Changrabandha–New Cooch Behar line of Northeast Frontier Railway, Alipurduar railway division.

Trains
Some local trains like 

 
are available from this station. Other major trains are available from New Mal Junction railway station.

References

Alipurduar railway division
Railway stations in West Bengal
Railway stations in Jalpaiguri district